The Willie Clancy Summer School (Irish Scoil Samhraidh Willie Clancy) is Ireland's largest traditional music summer school held annually since 1973 in memory of the uilleann piper Willie Clancy. During the week, nearly a thousand students from every part of the world attend daily classes taught by experts in Irish music and dance. In addition, a full program of lectures, recitals, dances (céilithe) and exhibitions are run by the summer school.

All events happen in the town of Milltown Malbay, in County Clare, on the west coast of Ireland, during the week beginning with the first Saturday of July. The weekly registration includes six classes, all lectures and recitals (except the Saturday concert) and reduced price admission to céilithe. Lectures, recitals, concert and céilithe are open to the public.

The school
Founded by a committee of local people, after the death of their friend and neighbour Willie Clancy, at a young age, in early 1973. The group included Paddy McMahon, Paddy Malone, Micheal O Friel, Junior Crehan, Martin Talty, Sean Reid, JC Talty and Jimmy Ward. These were later joined by Muiris Ó Rócháin (moved from Kerry 1971), Peadar O'Loughlin (Kilmaley) and after the first ten years of the school Eamonn McGivney and Harry Hughes.

The school has a fine reputation as an event where Irish traditional music can be learned and practised by all. The school was founded with the idea that music could be learned outside of the strictures of competition or borders. Students are children or teenagers as well as adults. All are mixed within classes according to level of musicianship on a particular instrument. It is possible during the week to attend activities as different as reed making workshops for pipes, as well as concertina classes, for example.

Classes are held in different venues: schools, hotels, and private houses. Depending on the student's wishes, it is possible to change teachers during the week. Teachers are chosen for their expertise and many are renowned exponents of Irish music and song.

The craic
Craic agus ceol: "fun and music" in Irish, is a frequent description for the atmosphere. During the week, crowds come to Milltown Malbay solely for informal playing, or to listen to traditional Irish music in all kinds of venues - pubs, kitchens, and streets. This audience does not necessarily attend classes.

See also
 Queen Maeve International Summer School

References

External links
Willie Clancy Summer School official website

Music schools in the Republic of Ireland
Irish folk music
Education in County Clare
Summer schools
Celtic music festivals
Milltown Malbay